Drahanovice is a municipality and village in Olomouc District in the Olomouc Region of the Czech Republic. It has about 1,800 inhabitants.

Administrative parts
Villages of Kníničky, Lhota pod Kosířem, Ludéřov and Střížov are administrative parts of Drahanovice.

References

Villages in Olomouc District